The 1944 TCU Horned Frogs football team represented Texas Christian University (TCU) in the 1944 college football season. The Horned Frogs finished the season 7–3–1 overall and 3–1–1 in the Southwest Conference. The team was coached by Dutch Meyer in his eleventh year as head coach. The Frogs played their home games in Amon G. Carter Stadium, which is located on campus in Fort Worth, Texas. They were invited to the Cotton Bowl Classic, where they lost to Oklahoma A&M by a score of 34–0.

Schedule

References

TCU
TCU Horned Frogs football seasons
Southwest Conference football champion seasons
TCU Horned Frogs football